Larrabee is a city in Cherokee County, Iowa, United States. The population was 123 at the time of the 2020 census.

History
A post office called Larrabee has been in operation since 1877. The city was named after William Larrabee, the 13th Governor of Iowa.

Geography
Larrabee is located at  (42.861284, -95.545135).

Demographics

2010 census
As of the census of 2010, there were 132 people, 62 households, and 38 families living in the city. The racial makeup of the city was 97.7% White and 2.3% African American. Hispanic or Latino of any race were 4.5% of the population.

There were 62 households, of which 24.2% had children under the age of 18 living with them, 38.7% were married couples living together, 14.5% had a female householder with no husband present, 8.1% had a male householder with no wife present, and 38.7% were non-families. 33.9% of all households were made up of individuals, and 11.3% had someone living alone who was 65 years of age or older. The average household size was 2.13 and the average family size was 2.58.

The median age in the city was 45.5 years. 20.5% of residents were under the age of 18; 10.6% were between the ages of 18 and 24; 19% were from 25 to 44; 35.6% were from 45 to 64; and 14.4% were 65 years of age or older. The gender makeup of the city was 50.0% male and 50.0% female.

2000 census
As of the census of 2000, there were 149 people, 73 households, and 42 families living in the city. The racial makeup of the city was 100.00% White.

There were 73 households, out of which 23.3% had children under the age of 18 living with them, 41.1% were married couples living together, 12.3% had a female householder with no husband present, and 41.1% were non-families. 38.4% of all households were made up of individuals, and 16.4% had someone living alone who was 65 years of age or older. The average household size was 2.04 and the average family size was 2.56.

In the city, the population was spread out, with 22.1% under the age of 18, 6.0% from 18 to 24, 26.2% from 25 to 44, 26.8% from 45 to 64, and 18.8% who were 65 years of age or older. The median age was 42 years. For every 100 females, there were 91.0 males. For every 100 females age 18 and over, there were 100.0 males.

The median income for a household in the city was $22,500, and the median income for a family was $23,438. Males had a median income of $35,000 versus $19,688 for females. The per capita income for the city was $13,306. There were 3.4% of families and 3.2% of the population living below the poverty line, including no under eighteens and 11.5% of those over 64.

Education
The Cherokee Community School District operates local schools.

References

Cities in Cherokee County, Iowa
Cities in Iowa